Lissette Cuza Díaz (born 26 February 1975 in Marianao) is a retired Cuban athlete who specialised in the long jump. She represented her country at two Summer Olympics, in 1996 and 2000, failing to qualify for the final.

Her personal best of 6.99 metres, set in 2000 in Jena, is the current national record.

Competition record

References

1975 births
Living people
Athletes from Havana
Cuban female long jumpers
Athletes (track and field) at the 1996 Summer Olympics
Athletes (track and field) at the 2000 Summer Olympics
Olympic athletes of Cuba
Athletes (track and field) at the 1999 Pan American Games
Pan American Games competitors for Cuba
20th-century Cuban women
20th-century Cuban people